A parish is a territorial entity in many Christian denominations, constituting a division within a diocese. A parish is under the pastoral care and clerical jurisdiction of a priest, often termed a parish priest, who might be assisted by one or more curates, and who operates from a parish church. Historically, a parish often covered the same geographical area as a manor. Its association with the parish church remains paramount.

By extension the term parish refers not only to the territorial entity but to the people of its community or congregation as well as to church property within it. In England this church property was technically in ownership of the parish priest ex-officio, vested in him on his institution to that parish.

Etymology and use

As an ancient concept, the term "parish" occurs in the long-established Christian denominations: Catholic, Anglican Communion, the Eastern Orthodox Church, and Lutheran churches, and in some Methodist, Congregationalist and Presbyterian administrations.

The eighth Archbishop of Canterbury Theodore of Tarsus (c. 602–690) appended the parish structure to the Anglo-Saxon township unit, where it existed, and where minsters catered to the surrounding district.

Territorial structure

Broadly speaking, the parish is the standard unit in episcopal polity of church administration, although parts of a parish may be subdivided as a chapelry, with a chapel of ease or filial church serving as the local place of worship in cases of difficulty to access the main parish church.

In the wider picture of ecclesiastical polity, a parish comprises a division of a diocese or see. Parishes within a diocese may be grouped into a deanery or vicariate forane (or simply vicariate), overseen by a dean or vicar forane, or in some cases by an archpriest. Some churches of the Anglican Communion have deaneries as units of an archdeaconry.

Outstations

An outstation is a newly-created congregation, a term usually used where the church is evangelical, or a mission and particularly in African countries, but also historically in Australia. They exist mostly within the Catholic and Anglican parishes.

The Anglican Diocese of Cameroon describes their outstations as the result of outreach work "initiated, sponsored and supervised by the mother parishes". Once there is a big enough group of worshippers in the same place, the outstation in named by the bishop of the diocese. They are run by "catechists/evangelists" or lay readers, and supervised by the creator parish or archdeaconry.

Outstations are not self-supporting, and in poor areas often consist of a very simple structure. The parish priest visits as often as possible. If and when the community has grown enough, the outstation may become a parish and have a parish priest assigned to it.

The Assemblies of God denomination has churches and outstations throughout the world.

Church of England

The Church of England's geographical structure uses the local parish church as its basic unit. The parish system survived the Reformation with the Anglican Church's secession from Rome remaining largely untouched; thus, it shares its roots with the Catholic Church's system described below. Parishes may extend into different counties or hundreds and historically many parishes comprised extra outlying portions in addition to its principal district, usually being described as 'detached' and intermixed with the lands of other parishes.  Church of England parishes nowadays all lie within one of 44 dioceses divided between the provinces of Canterbury, 30 and York, 12.

Each parish normally has its own parish priest (either a vicar or rector, owing to the vagaries of the feudal tithe system: rectories usually having had greater income) and perhaps supported by one or more curates or deacons - although as a result of ecclesiastical pluralism some parish priests might have held more than one parish living, placing a curate in charge of those where they do not reside.  Now, however, it is common for a number of neighbouring parishes to be placed under one benefice in the charge of a priest who conducts services by rotation, with additional services being provided by lay readers or other non-ordained members of the church community.

A chapelry was a subdivision of an ecclesiastical parish in England, and parts of Lowland Scotland up to the mid 19th century. It had a similar status to a township but was so named as it had a chapel which acted as a subsidiary place of worship to the main parish church.

In England civil parishes and their governing parish councils evolved in the 19th century as ecclesiastical parishes began to be relieved of what became considered to be civic responsibilities.  Thus their boundaries began to diverge.  The word "parish" acquired a secular usage. Since 1895, a parish council elected by public vote or a (civil) parish meeting administers a civil parish and is formally recognised as the level of local government below a district council.

The traditional structure of the Church of England with the parish as the basic unit has been exported to other countries and churches throughout the Anglican Communion and Commonwealth but does not necessarily continue to be administered in the same way.

Church of Scotland

The parish is also the basic level of church administration in the Church of Scotland. Spiritual oversight of each parish church in Scotland is responsibility of the congregation's Kirk Session. Patronage was regulated in 1711 (Patronage Act) and abolished in 1874, with the result that ministers must be elected by members of the congregation. Many parish churches in Scotland today are "linked" with neighbouring parish churches served by a single minister. Since the abolition of parishes as a unit of civil government in Scotland in 1929, Scottish parishes have purely ecclesiastical significance and the boundaries may be adjusted by the local Presbytery.

Church in Wales

The church in Wales was disestablished in 1920 and is made up of six dioceses. Parishes were also civil administration areas until communities were established in 1974.

Methodist Church
Although they are more often simply called congregations and have no geographic boundaries, in the United Methodist Church congregations are called parishes.  A prominent example of this usage comes in The Book of Discipline of The United Methodist Church, in which the committee of every local congregation that handles staff support is referred to as the committee on Pastor-Parish Relations.  This committee gives recommendations to the bishop on behalf of the parish/congregation since it is the United Methodist Bishop of the episcopal area who appoints a pastor to each congregation. The same is true in the African Methodist Episcopal Church and the Christian Methodist Episcopal Church.

In New Zealand, a local grouping of Methodist churches that share one or more ministers (which in the United Kingdom would be called a circuit) is referred to as a parish.

Catholic Church

In the Catholic Church, each parish normally has its own parish priest (in some countries called pastor or provost), who has responsibility and canonical authority over the parish.

What in most English-speaking countries is termed the "parish priest" is referred to as the "pastor" in the United States, where the term "parish priest" is used of any priest assigned to a parish even in a subordinate capacity. These are called "assistant priests", "parochial vicars", "curates", or, in the United States, "associate pastors" and "assistant pastors".

Each diocese (administrative region) is divided into parishes, each with their own central church called the parish church, where religious services take place. Some larger parishes or parishes that have been combined under one parish priest may have two or more such churches, or the parish may be responsible for chapels (or chapels of ease) located at some distance from the mother church for the convenience of distant parishioners. In addition to a parish church, each parish may maintain auxiliary organizations and their facilities such as a rectory, parish hall, parochial school, or convent, frequently located on the same campus or adjacent to the church.

Normally, a parish comprises all Catholics living within its geographically defined area, but non-territorial parishes can also be established within a defined area on a personal basis for Catholics belonging to a particular rite, language, nationality, or community. An example is that of personal parishes established in accordance with the 7 July 2007 motu proprio Summorum Pontificum for those attached to the pre-Vatican II liturgy.

See also
 Parish church
 Parish pump
 Parish registers: Birth certificate, Marriage certificate, Death certificate
 Collegiate church
 Priory church
 Cathedral
 Parochial school

References

Citations

Sources 

 Sidney Webb, Beatrice Potter.   English Local Government from the Revolution to the Municipal Corporations.   London: Longmans, Green and Co., 1906
 James Barry Bird. The laws respecting parish matters: containing the several offices and duties of churchwardens, overseers of the poor, constables, watchmen, and other parish officers : the laws concerning rates and assessments, settlements and removals of the poor, and of the poor in general.   Publisher	W. Clarke, 1799

Further reading
Hart, A. Tindal (1959) The Country Priest in English History. London: Phoenix House
--do.-- (1958) The Country Clergy in Elizabethan & Stuart Times, 1558-1660. London: Phoenix House
--do.-- (1955) The Eighteenth Century Country Parson, circa 1689 to 1830, Shrewsbury: Wilding & Son
--do.-- & Carpenter, E. F. (1954) The Nineteenth Century Country Parson; circa 1832-1900. Shrewsbury: Wilding & Son

External links

 Crockford's Clerical Directory
 In praise of ... civil parishes Editorial in The Guardian, 2011-05-16.

 
Christian terminology
Anglican organizations
Parishes